Andréas Winding (1928-1977) was a French cinematographer known for such films as Henri-Georges Clouzot's Inferno, Friends, A Slightly Pregnant Man, Don Juan, or If Don Juan Were a Woman, Playtime, The Deadly Trap, Rider on the Rain and La Prisonnière.

Selected filmography
 Graduation Year (1964)
 Sept morts sur ordonnance (1975)
 Parisian Life (1977)

References

External links

1977 deaths
1928 births
French cinematographers